Noel Mayo (born December 30, 1937) is an American industrial designer who founded the first African American industrial design firm. His company, Noel Mayo associates, has produced work for clients like IBM, NASA, and the National Museum of American Jewish History.

Early life 
Mayo was born on December 30, 1937, in Orange, New Jersey to Noel and Blanche Mayo. As a child he moved around a lot until his middle school years where he attended a boarding school in Cheney, Pennsylvania called Sunnycrest Farm for Negro Boys. While attending high school he worked at an art store. The owner of the store allowed Mayo to borrow any of the art books he wanted. This is when he would discover the field of industrial design. He would go on to attend the Philadelphia College of Art, and in 1960 became the first black person to receive an industrial design degree from that school.

Career 
During his junior year in college his professor Joseph Carreiro, who was the head of the department at the time, hired Mayo to work for his firm Carreiro/Sklaroff Design Associates. While the owners of the design firm were on an extended vacation, Mayo was given the responsibility of running the office by himself. In 1964, after graduating from school, he would eventually buy the firm and change the name to Noel Mayo Associates.

Noel Mayo Associates 
Under the newly acquired leadership of Mayo, Noel Mayo Associates would work with clients across all industries. Some of these clients include The Department of Commerce and Agriculture, the IRS, NASA, IBM, Philadelphia International Airport, Black+Decker and the Museum of American Jewish History. Noel Mayo Associates designed interiors for both public and private spaces, furniture, electronics, lighting, signage, products, packaging, and graphics. Interiors include homes, airports, offices, schools, waiting rooms, stores, and restaurants. During a 45-year partnership with the Lutron Electronics company his name appeared on over 250 design patents and 27 utility patents, most notably for light switches and dimmers.

Education and service 
Mayo would go on to become the chairperson of the industrial design department at the Philadelphia College of Art.

In 1989 Ohio State University named Noel Mayo the Ohio Eminent scholar in Art and Design Technology. He taught the school's Professional Practices course for 20 years.

Mayo has served as the president of the Philadelphia Economic Council and as the president of the Philadelphia Community Development Corporation. He has served as an advisor to MetroBank of Philadelphia as well as a commissioner of the Philadelphia Art Commission.

He has served on the board of directors for the University of the Arts. He also served on the board of directors for the Philadelphia Free Library. In 1981 he was given an honorary D.F.A degree from the Massachusetts College of Art. He has established a directory of minority professionals working in design and established multiple mentoring programs for minorities working in design.

References 

Wikipedia Student Program
1937 births
American industrial designers
People from Orange, New Jersey
University of the Arts (Philadelphia) alumni
Ohio State University faculty
University of the Arts (Philadelphia) faculty
African-American designers
Living people